Guana is a generic ethnic name of the Gran Chaco. It may refer to:
Guana language (Paraguay)
Guana language (Brazil)
Guana language (Argentina)